The 1964 Star World Championships were held in Boston, USA in 1964.

Results

References 
 
 

Star World Championships
1964 in sailing
Star World Championships in the United States